Ordinari Freytags Post-Zeitung is the first newspaper to be published in the Baltic Region in 1675 in Reval. It was published in the German language  by Christoph Brendenken.

References

Publications established in 1675
German-language newspapers published in Europe
1675 establishments in Europe